The following list includes all of the Canadian Register of Historic Places listings in Columbia-Shuswap Regional District, British Columbia.

References 

(references appear in the table above as external links)

Columbia-Shuswap Regional District